The Albany, Georgia Metropolitan Statistical Area, as defined by the United States Census Bureau, is an area consisting of five counties – Baker, Dougherty, Lee, Terrell, and Worth – in southwest Georgia, anchored by the City of Albany.  As of the 2010 census, the MSA had a population of 157,832 (though a March 31, 2022 estimate placed the population at 146,961).

Counties
Baker
Dougherty
Lee
Terrell
Worth

Communities
Places with more than 10,000 inhabitants
Albany
Places with 1,000 to 10,000 inhabitants
Dawson
Leesburg
Putney
Sylvester
Places with 500 to 1,000 inhabitants
Bronwood
Poulan
Smithville
Places with less than 500 inhabitants
Parrott
Sasser
Sumner
Warwick
Unincorporated places
Acree
Oakfield
Pecan City
Pretoria
Radium Springs

Demographics
As of the census of 2000, there were 157,833 people, 57,403 households, and 41,206 families residing within the MSA. The racial makeup of the MSA was 49.33% White, 48.66% African American, 0.25% Native American, 0.54% Asian, 0.02% Pacific Islander, 0.50% from other races, and 0.70% from two or more races. Hispanic or Latino of any race were 1.32% of the population.

The median income for a household in the MSA was $33,845, and the median income for a family was $39,361. Males had a median income of $31,094 versus $21,055 for females. The per capita income for the MSA was $16,652.

See also
Georgia statistical areas
List of municipalities in Georgia (U.S. state)

References

 
Metropolitan areas of Georgia (U.S. state)